Reece Papuni (born 2 October 1987) is a New Zealand professional boxer. As an amateur, he reached the quarterfinals of the 2010 Commonwealth Games.

Papuni is a former New Zealand national Light Heavyweight champion when he defeated Sam Rapira for the title in October 2014. Papuni is trained by well known and highly accomplished boxing trainer, Phil Shatford.

Amateur career 
During his amateur career, Papuni got to fight on a David Tua undercard as an amateur when Papuni took on Tyson Sykes on the Tua vs Barrett II fight card. Papuni was considered very hopeful to go to the 2012 olympics.

Professional boxing career

Early professional career 
In 2013, Papuni took on Scott Taliauli at the Wilding Park. Papuni won the fight by third round stoppage. In April 2014, Papuni took on MMA fighter Eddie Lenart. Papuni stated he did not know his opponent. Papuni won the fight by sixth round stoppage.

Papuni vs Rapira
In October 2014, Papuni took on one of his biggest rivals of his careers, Sam Rapira for the New Zealand national (NZNBF version) Light Heavyweight title on a Joseph Parker undercard, promoted by Duco Events. Rapira was the defending champion. The two has fought multiple times during their amateurs career. Papuni won the fight by stoppage in the fourth round, one of his biggest wins of his career.

WBA Regional title fight, Christchurch return 
Papuni was originally scheduled to fight on another Joseph Parker undercard with Duco events in March 2015, however, the fight did not go ahead. On June 2015, Papuni took on Trent Broadhurst for the vacant WBA Oceania Light Heavyweight title. Papuni took this big risk in hopes to reach the top 15 in the WBA. Unfortunately, Papuni lost the fight by fifth round stoppage, first loss of his professional career. In September 2019, Papuni took on Samoan boxer Tony Iapesa at Horncastle Arena in Christchurch. Papuni won the fight by fifth round stoppage. The event raised $183,000 for charity.

Super 8 Four Man Tournament
In early November 2015, Papuni Took part in the Four man Tournament. Papuni joined Robert Berridge, Sefo Falekaono and Brad Riddell in the tournament. Papuni Won the Tournament, winning against Brad Riddell and Robert Berridge.

Hometown return, Australasian title, retirement 
In March 2016, Papuni took on Joshua Tai at the Addington Raceway. Papuni won the fight by Majority Decision. Papuni at the time contemplated moving to Australia to improve his career. In September 2016, Papuni took on Faris Chevalier for the ANBF Australasian Super Middleweight title. Papuni lost the fight by ninth round stoppage.

After three years from being away from the ring, Papuni took on Blake Caparello for the WBA Oceania Light Heavyweight title. Caparello won the fight by eighth round stoppage. In November 2019, Papuni returned to the ring when he took on Alex Tzinavos in Nelson. Papuni won the fight by Unanimous Decision, giving him his first win in over three years.

Amateur boxing titles
2003 New Zealand Amateur Champion (Junior 81 kg) 
2009 New Zealand Amateur 81 kg Champion
2010 Jameson Belt (Most scientific senior male) 76th Winner
2010 New Zealand Amateur 81 kg Champion
2011 New Zealand Amateur 81 kg Champion

Professional boxing titles
Tournament
Super Eight Boxing Tournament Winner (2015)
World Boxing Federation
WBF Oceania light heavyweight title (2013)
New Zealand National Boxing Federation 
New Zealand National light heavyweight title(2014)

Professional boxing record

|-  style="text-align:center; background:#e3e3e3;"
|  style="border-style:none none solid solid; "|Res.
|  style="border-style:none none solid solid; "|Record
|  style="border-style:none none solid solid; "|Opponent
|  style="border-style:none none solid solid; "|Type
|  style="border-style:none none solid solid; "|Rd., Time
|  style="border-style:none none solid solid; "|Date
|  style="border-style:none none solid solid; "|Location
|  style="border-style:none none solid solid; "|Notes
|- align=center
|Win
|14–3
|align=left| Alex Tzinavos
|
|
|
|align=left|
|align=left|
|- align=center
|Lose
|13–3
|align=left| Blake Caparello
|
|
|
|align=left|
|align=left|
|- align=center
|Lose
|13–2
|align=left| Faris Chevalier
|
|
|
|align=left|
|align=left|
|- align=center
|Win
|13–1
|align=left| Joshua Tai
|
|
|
|align=left|
|align=left|
|- align=center
|Win
|12–1
|align=left| Robert Berridge
|
|
|
|align=left|
|align=left|
|- align=center
|Win
|11–1
|align=left| Brad Riddell
|
|
|
|align=left|
|align=left|
|- align=center
|Win
|10–1
|align=left| Tony Iapesa
|
|
|
|align=left|
|align=left|
|- align=center
|Loss
|9–1
|align=left| Trent Broadhurst
|
|
|
|align=left|
|align=left|
|- align=center
|Win
|9–0
|align=left| Mike Junior Kapi
|
|
|
|align=left|
|align=left|
|- align=center
|Win
|8–0
|align=left| Sam Rapira
|
|
|
|align=left|
|align=left|
|- align=center
|Win
|7–0
|align=left| Eddie Lenart
|
|
|
|align=left|
|align=left|
|- align=center
|Win
|6–0
|align=left| Avefu'a Iakopo Jnr
|
|
|
|align=left|
|align=left|
|- align=center
|Win
|5–0
|align=left| Scott Taliauli
|
|
|
|align=left|
|align=left|
|- align=center
|Win
|4–0
|align=left| Andrew Robinson
|
|
|
|align=left|
|align=left|
|- align=center
|Win
|3–0
|align=left| Ritchie Harris
|
|
|
|align=left|
|align=left|
|- align=center
|Win
|2–0
|align=left| Jacques Marsters
|
|
|
|align=left|
|align=left| 
|- align=center
|Win
|1–0
|align=left| John Roil
|
|
|
|align=left|
|align=left|

Personal life 
Papuni is Maori with decendents of Ngā Rauru, Ngai Tahu, and Ngāti Porou.

Awards and recognitions
2019 Gladrap Boxing Awards Returning Boxer of the year (Nominated)

References

|-

1987 births
Living people
Boxers from Christchurch
New Zealand male boxers
Light-heavyweight boxers
Boxers at the 2010 Commonwealth Games
New Zealand professional boxing champions
Commonwealth Games competitors for New Zealand